Champion is an unincorporated community and census-designated place in central Chase County, Nebraska, United States. As of the 2010 census, it had a population of 103. It has a post office with the ZIP code 69023.

Geography

Demographics

History
Champion was named for Champion S. Chase, a Nebraska politician.

References

Census-designated places in Chase County, Nebraska
Census-designated places in Nebraska